Mehdi Noori (born February 18, 1980) is an Iranian retired footballer who plays for Foolad in the IPL.

Club career
Noori joined Shahin Bushehr in 2009 after spending the previous season at Damash Gilan.

Club career statistics

Honours

Club
Pegah Gilan
Hazfi Cup Runner-up: 2007–08

Shahin Bushehr
Hazfi Cup Runner-up: 2011–12

Foolad
Iran Pro League (1): 2013–14

References

1980 births
Living people
Shahin Bushehr F.C. players
Sportspeople from Tabriz
Paykan F.C. players
Pegah Gilan players
Damash Gilan players
Iranian footballers
Foolad FC players
Tractor S.C. players
Association football midfielders